Roderick Michael Love (August 5, 1953 – October 26, 2014) was a Canadian political strategist.  He served as chief of staff to Ralph Klein during Klein's tenure as Mayor of Calgary and Premier of Alberta.

Political career
He was born in Yorkton, Saskatchewan in 1953. In 1992, he ran in the Calgary-Buffalo by-election as Progressive Conservative, receiving just 15% of the vote.  In 1998, he established Rod Love Consulting Inc.

Love attended the University of Alberta and the University of Calgary and was a member of the board of governors of the University of Calgary and the Canada West Foundation.

In 2012, Love was a co-host with Karin Klassen of Type A, a CBC Radio One talk show about the Canadian economy. He died at home surrounded by his family on October 26, 2014 of pancreatic cancer, aged 61.

References

External links
Rod Love biography
Rod Love's Blog on Politics and Life

1953 births
2014 deaths
Canadian political consultants
CBC Radio hosts
Deaths from pancreatic cancer
People from Calgary
People from Yorkton
Progressive Conservative Association of Alberta candidates in Alberta provincial elections